Newton Farm may refer to:

A. Newton Farm, a historic home and farm in New York State, USA
Edrom Newton Farm, an historic farm house in Edrom, Berwickshire, Scotland
A housing development at Newton, South Lanarkshire, Scotland
A ward in Herefordshire, West Midlands, England; see 2019 Herefordshire Council election

See also
Newton (disambiguation)